Kanamarua adonis is a species of sea snail, a marine gastropod mollusk in the family Colubrariidae.

Description
(Original description as Conus (Aulacofusus) adonis) The small shell measures 37 mm. It is bulimiform, thin, whitish with a pale olive periostracum. The shell contains about six whorls, exclusive of the (lost) protoconch. It has a very narrowly channeled suture and moderately rounded whorls. The spiral sculpture consists of narrow equal flat threads (about three to a millimeter) with very narrow interspaces over the whole shell, though the interspaces are a little wider on the apical whorls and the spirals under-run there by thread-like axial sculpture, giving a somev/hat punctate appearance under magnification. The aperture is elongate and rather narrow. The outer lip is thickened, not reflected, with traces of liration near the inside margin. The body and the columella contain  a continuous layer of enamel. The siphonal canal is short and wide. It has no siphonal fascicle.

Distribution
This marine species occurs in Suruga Gulf, Japan.

References

 Fraussen K. & Lamy D. (2008). Revision of the genus Kanamarua Kuroda, 1951 (Gastropoda: Colubrariidae) with the description of two new species. Novapex 9(4): 129-140

External links
 Bouchet, P. & Warén, A. (1986). Mollusca Gastropoda: Taxonomical notes on tropical deep water Buccinidae with descriptions of new taxa. in: Forest, J. (Ed.) Résultats des Campagnes MUSORSTOM I et II Philippines (1976, 1980). Tome 2. Mémoires du Muséum national d'Histoire naturelle. Série A, Zoologie. 133: 457-499

Colubrariidae
Gastropods described in 1919